Satyrium titus, the coral hairstreak, is a North American butterfly in the family Lycaenidae.

Description
This tailless hairstreak is brownish gray on the upper side of the wings.  The underside of the hindwing has a distinct row of red-orange spots along the outer margin, but lacks the blue spot found in most hairstreaks.

Habitat
This butterfly favors brushy places, thickets, overgrown fields, open woodlands, and streamsides.

Nectar plants
The coral hairstreak is frequently seen visiting butterfly weed, but also uses New Jersey tea, dogbane and sulphur flower as nectar plants.

Host plants
Caterpillars have often been reported on feeding on the fruits of wild plums and cherries (Prunus), and have also been observed on serviceberry (Amelanchier alnifolia) and oaks (Quercus).

References 

Jim P. Brock, Kenn Kaufman (2003). Butterflies of North America. Boston: Houghton Mifflin. .

External links
 S. titus photos, BugGuide
 S. titus photos, Cirrus Image
 S. titus info, ODNR Division of Wildlife 
 Satyrium titus Wisconsin Butterflies

Butterflies of North America
Satyrium (butterfly)
Butterflies described in 1793
Taxa named by Johan Christian Fabricius